Earl Warren College is one of seven undergraduate colleges at the University of California, San Diego. Warren College has one of the largest student populations at UCSD, with over 4,000 undergraduate students, comprising about one fifth of the student population. It is named for former California Governor and Chief Justice Earl Warren. Warren College was founded in 1974.

Residence halls and apartments 

Each of the residence halls within Warren College is named after justices that sat on the U.S. Supreme Court along with Chief Justice Warren. Residence halls are located near the ecological reserve, a canyon filled with eucalyptus trees and hiking trails.

Residence Halls include:

Stewart
Frankfurter
Harlan

Apartments for both first and second year students include:

Black
Brennan
Douglas
Goldberg

There are also graduate student apartments available at the Warren Campus.

Student life
Warren College has various student organizations. These include: Warren College Student Council (WCSC), Warren College Events Board, Warren Transfer and Commuter Commission (WTCC), Commission on Warren Spirit (COWS), Frosh Small Group, Provost's Student Advisory Council (PSAC), Warren College Honors Council, Warren Initiative for Student Health (WISH), and Warren Association of Volunteer Enthusiasts (WAVE).

The Warren College campus is also home to an enormous rock sculpture in the shape of a bear, known as "Bearl," located on the engineering quad.

Educational Philosophy and Programs

Reflecting Earl Warren's tenure as Chief Justice, Warren College's official motto is "Toward a life in balance."

Warren College emphasizes the importance of living a balanced life and creating a balanced education. Warren College has general education requirements that are easy to individualize, though the campus-wide requirement of two writing courses still holds. While the number of classes required is no less than the other five colleges, one often has more freedom in choosing classes.

Programs of Concentration
All courses are organized into three disciplines, (1) math/physical sciences, (2) social sciences, and (3) the humanities. Warren College allows students to pursue a major of their choice in any discipline while requiring the completion of two Programs of Concentration (PofCs) in the other two disciplines. Each Program of Concentration is composed of six courses, of 4-units, (e.g., a history major could take six classes in political science and six classes in biology as well).

Engineering students
Student looking towards an engineering, B.S. degree, however, are required to complete two area studies (A/S), each comprising three courses of 4 units, at least two of which must be upper-division courses. Similar to PofCs, area studies must be non-contiguous to the student's major and to each other.

Warren College is home to a large number of engineering students because its general education requirements are more flexible for students pursuing an undergraduate degree in engineering.

In 2006, the college has added a new building dedicated to the study of Information Technology, called Calit2.

Writing programs
Warren College's writing program consists of a two-quarter sequence based on the model of argumentation developed by British philosopher Stephen Toulmin.

References

External links
Official Warren College Site
Overview of UCSD's College System
UC San Diego College System
 UC San Diego College Comparison

University of California, San Diego
Brutalist architecture in California
Educational institutions established in 1974